{{Infobox book
| name           = Prosperity Without Growth
| author         = Tim Jackson
| language       = English
| country        = United Kingdom
| genre          = Non-fiction
| published      = 2009 (first edition)2017 (second edition)
| publisher      = Routledge
| isbn           = 978-1138935419
| exclude_cover  = 
| italic title   = 
| image          = Prosperity Without Growth - bookcover.jpg
| image_size     = 
| alt            = 
| caption        = 
| audio_read_by  = 
| title_orig     = Prosperity without growth? The transition to a sustainable economy (report of the Sustainable Development Commission)
| orig_lang_code = 
| title_working  = 
| translator     = 
| illustrator    = 
| cover_artist   = 
| series         = 
| release_number = 
| subject        = Sustainability, economics, post-growth, prosperity
| set_in         = 
| publisher2     = 
| pub_date       = 
| english_pub_date = 
| media_type     = 
| pages          = 
| awards         = 
| isbn_note      = 
| oclc           = 
| dewey          = 
| congress       = 
| preceded_by    = 
| followed_by    = 
| native_wikisource = 
| wikisource     = 
| notes          =
| website        =
}}Prosperity Without Growth is a book by author and economist Tim Jackson. It was originally released as a report by the Sustainable Development Commission. The study rapidly became the most downloaded report in the Commission's nine-year history when it was published in 2009. The report was later that year reworked and published as a book by Earthscan. A revised and expanded edition (Prosperity Without Growth: Foundations for the Economy of Tomorrow) was published in January 2017.

 Description 
By arguing that "prosperityin any meaningful sense of the wordtranscends material concerns", the book summarizes the evidence showing that, beyond a certain point, growth does not increase human well-being. Prosperity without Growth analyses the complex relationships between economic growth, environmental crises and social recession. It proposes a route to a sustainable economy, and argues for a redefinition of "prosperity" in light of the evidence on what really contributes to people’s well-being.

The second edition expands on these ideas and sets out the framework for what he calls "the economy of tomorrow". By attending the nature of enterprise as a form of social organisation, the meaning of work as participation in society, the function of investment as a commitment to the future; and the role of money as a social good, he demonstrates how the economy may be transformed in ways that protect employment, promote and facilitate social investment, reduce inequality and support both ecological and financial stability.

 Reviews 
The first edition was described by Le Monde as "one of the most outstanding pieces of environmental economics literature in recent years". The sociologist Anthony Giddens referred to it as "a must-read for anyone concerned with issues of climate change and sustainabilitybold, original and comprehensive." The second edition received endorsements from Yanis Varoufakis, who referred to it as "essential reading for those refusing to succumb to a dystopic future". Noam Chomsky called it a "thoughtful and penetrating critique". Herman Daly praised it with: "It is hard to improve a classic, but Jackson has done it... a clearly written yet scholarly union of moral vision, with solid economics." Rowan Williams called it "one of the most important essays of our generation: both visionary and realistic, rooted in careful research and setting out difficult but achievable goals, it gives what we so badly needan alternative to passivity, short-term selfishness and cynicism".

 Structure 

The second edition of Prosperity without growth: Foundations for the Economy of Tomorrow is organised in eleven chapters:
 The limits to growth
 Prosperity lost
 Redefining prosperity
 The dilemma of growth
 The myth of decoupling
 The 'iron cage' of consumerism
 Flourishingwithin limits
 Foundations for the economy of tomorrow
 Towards a 'post-growth' macroeconomics
 The progressive State
 A lasting prosperity

 Translations Prosperity without Growth: Economics for a Finite Planet (2009) has been translated into eighteen languages including Swedish (Välfärd utan tillväxt: så skapar vi ett hållbart samhälle, 2011), German (Wohlstand ohne Wachstum, 2011), French (Prospérité sans croissance, 2010), Greek (Ευημερία χωρίς ανάπτυξη, 2012), Spanish (Prosperidad sin crecimiento, 2011), Italian (Prosperità senza crescita, 2011), Dutch (Welvaart zonder groei, 2010) and Chinese (无增长的繁荣，2011).

The second edition, Prosperity without Growth: Foundations for the Economy of Tomorrow (2017), has been translated into German, French, Italian, and Danish.

 See also 
 Degrowth
 Post-growth
 Steady-state economy
 Stern Review
 Material Concerns'', a 1996 book by Jackson

References

External links 

 Review in The Guardian (January 2010)
 Routledge website for Prosperity Without Growth
 Biography of Tim Jackson (official website)
 Tim Jackson's Media Archive (official website)

2009 in the environment
2009 non-fiction books
Books about energy issues
British non-fiction books
Books critical of economic growth
Economics of sustainability
Environmental non-fiction books
Sustainability books